Gladstone Township is one of eleven townships in Henderson County, Illinois, USA.  As of the 2010 census, its population was 962 and it contained 536 housing units.

Geography

Cities, towns, villages
 Gladstone
 Gulf Port (north half)

Unincorporated towns
 Lone Tree at 
(This list is based on USGS data and may include former settlements.)

Cemeteries
The township contains these two cemeteries: Kemp and South Henderson.

Major highways
  U.S. Route 34
  Illinois Route 164

Lakes
 Crystal Lake
 Dutton Lake
 Gladstone Lake
 Pogue Lake
 Stony Point Lake

Landmarks
 Lock and Dam No. 18
 Oquawka State Wildlife Refuge

Demographics

School districts
 West Central Community Unit School District 235

Political districts
 Illinois's 17th congressional district
 State House District 94
 State Senate District 47

References
 United States Census Bureau 2008 TIGER/Line Shapefiles
 
 United States National Atlas

External links
 City-Data.com
 Illinois State Archives
 Township Officials of Illinois

Townships in Henderson County, Illinois
1906 establishments in Illinois
Populated places established in 1906
Townships in Illinois
Illinois populated places on the Mississippi River